Nicole Dryden (born April 5, 1975) is a former competitive swimmer who represented Canada at two consecutive Summer Olympics.

Early years 

Dryden was born in Calgary, Alberta in 1975.

Swimming career 

At the 1992 Summer Olympics in Barcelona, Spain, Dryden reached the finals with the Canadian women's relay teams in the 4x100-metre freestyle relay (eighth) and in the 4x100-metre medley relay (sixth).  In the individual women's 100-metre backstroke, Dryden advanced to the consolation final, finishing fourteenth overall; she also participated in qualifying heats of the women's 200-metre freestyle and the women's 200-metre backstroke.  Four years later at the 1996 Summer Olympics in Atlanta, Georgia, Dryden placed fourteenth in the women's 800-metre freestyle.

Dryden accepted an athletic scholarship to attend the University of Florida in Gainesville, Florida, where she was a member of the Florida Gators swimming and diving team from 1993 to 1996.  As a Gator swimmer she was a five-time Southeastern Conference (SEC) champion (twice in the 500-yard freestyle, twice in the 800-yard freestyle relay, and once in the 1,650-yard freestyle), and received nine All-American honors.  She was also a five-time Ivy League champion as a swimmer for the Brown Bears swimming team of Brown University in Providence, Rhode Island, and graduated from Brown with a bachelor's degree in international relations in 1998.

Life after competition swimming 

Dryden earned her juris doctor degree from Brooklyn Law School in Brooklyn, New York in 2005, and currently works as a human rights and immigration lawyer in the New York City office of Fragomen, Del Rey, Bernsen & Loewy.  Dryden previously served as a visa officer for the Australian High Commission in Sri Lanka and Kenya, and worked for the International Organization for Migration with Somali immigration officials.

Dryden also volunteers as an athlete ambassador for several organizations that work to support the rights of children around the world, including Right To Play and SwimLanka.  She is also a celebrity swimmer for Swim Across America, a charitable organization that works with former Olympic swimmers to raise funds for cancer research.

See also 

 Florida Gators
 List of Brown University people
 List of University of Florida Olympians
 List of Commonwealth Games medallists in swimming (women)

References

External links 

 Right To Play
 SwimLanka
 
 Women's Ivy League Swimming

1975 births
Living people
Brown Bears women's swimmers
Canadian people of British descent
Canadian female backstroke swimmers
Canadian female freestyle swimmers
Florida Gators women's swimmers
Brooklyn Law School alumni
New York (state) lawyers
Olympic swimmers of Canada
Swimmers from Calgary
Swimmers at the 1991 Pan American Games
Swimmers at the 1992 Summer Olympics
Swimmers at the 1996 Summer Olympics
Commonwealth Games bronze medallists for Canada
Pan American Games silver medalists for Canada
Swimmers at the 1994 Commonwealth Games
Commonwealth Games medallists in swimming
Pan American Games medalists in swimming
Medalists at the 1991 Pan American Games
Medallists at the 1994 Commonwealth Games